Trichognathus marginipennis is a species of beetle in the family Carabidae, the only species in the genus Trichognathus.

References

Dryptinae